The Lyme grass (Longalatedes elymi) is a species of moth of the family Noctuidae. It is found along the coasts of southern Sweden, southern Finland, Denmark, Estonia, northern Poland, northern Germany and eastern Great Britain.

Technical description and variation

Forewing bone colour, tinged with pale brownish between the veins; the veins  a little darker; outer line indicated by a double row of dark spots; hindwing luteous white; ab. saturatior Stgr. is deeper brown. Larva bone colour, sometimes with a yellow or reddish tinge; head reddish brown. The wingspan is about 36 mm.

Biology

Adults are on wing from June to August.

The larvae feed on Elymus arenarius. They feed inside the stem of their host plant, usually below the surface of the sand.

References

External links
UKmoths
Fauna Europaea

Xyleninae
Moths of Japan
Moths of Europe